Greg Haney (born September 5, 1959) is an American politician who has served in the Mississippi House of Representatives from the 118th district since 2012.

References

1959 births
Living people
Republican Party members of the Mississippi House of Representatives
21st-century American politicians